"Goodbye to You" is a single by American rock band Scandal. The song was written by band member Zack Smith.

Background
The video shows Patty Smyth in a bright red dress singing the lyrics to various members of the band as they perform the song.  Scandal keyboardist Benjy King is shown playing a rare Digital Keyboards Synergy synthesizer, which provided the main 8th note foundation of the track. Though he is not shown in the video, the song features Max Crook from Del Shannon’s band and Paul Shaffer (who at the time was bandleader and sidekick on Late Night with David Letterman) playing a solo—based on Del Shannon's "Runaway" on an Oberheim OB-Xa.

Original release information
It appeared on Scandal's 1982 Scandal EP. It hit #5 on Billboard's Album Rock play list.  The song was also released as a single, and reached #65 on the Billboard Hot 100.

References

External links
 Lyrics to "Goodbye To You"
 
 
 
 

1982 songs
1982 debut singles
Scandal (American band) songs
Columbia Records singles